Indians in Chile form one of the smaller populations of the Indian diaspora. The large majority of them of Sindhi descent. A few Indians went to Chile in the 1920s. Later more Indians migrated there in the 1980s - not only from India, but also from Hong Kong, Spain, Ivory Coast, Indonesia, Nigeria, Panama, the Philippines and Singapore.

History
Some migrants from British India (including Pakistan) arrived to work in mining, railroads and agriculture in the early 20th century, usually under British-owned corporations. However most Indians in Chile are new arrivals in the 1980s and the 1990s for economic reasons.

The first immigrants from India (mostly of Sindhi descent) arrived to Magallanes (present-day Punta Arenas) in 1904 and worked as traders. Their descendants moved to different parts of the country, though mostly to Santiago. Descendants of Sindhi migrants to Chile also live on the northern coast (i.e. Arica, Iquique and Antofagasta). A second large wave of Indian immigration occurred in the 1980s. These are the people who set up the Indian Association of Santiago.

As of 2012, there are about 1500 people of Indian origin living in the country, mostly in Iquique, Santiago and Punta Arenas. About 40 per cent of them have obtained Chilean nationality.

Business and employment
There are various commercial opportunities in Chile for Indian immigrants and multinational firms have begun to arrive and along with them Indian engineers.

Notable individuals
 Jennifer Mayani - model and actress

See also
 Asian Latin Americans
 Hinduism in Chile

References

Asian Chilean
 
Chile
Chile
Indian Latin American
Ethnic groups in Chile
Chile–India relations